Steve Nelson (born August 11, 1954) is an American jazz vibraphonist and marimba player. In addition to his solo work, Nelson is known for collaborating since the 1990s with bassist Dave Holland's Quintet and Big Band.

Nelson graduated from Rutgers University with both master's and bachelor's degrees in music, and his teaching activities have included a position at Princeton University. He has appeared at concerts and festivals worldwide and has made recordings as the leader of his own group. He has performed and recorded with Kenny Barron, Bobby Watson, Mulgrew Miller, David "Fathead" Newman, Johnny Griffin, and Jackie McLean.

Discography

As leader
 Full Nelson (Sunnyside 1990)
 Communications (Criss Cross 1990)
 Sound-Effect (HighNote, 2007)
 Stratocluster with Bruno Vansina (W.E.R.F. 2012)
 Brothers Under the Sun (HighNote, 2017)

As sideman
With Dave Holland
 Dream of the Elders (ECM, 1995)
 Points of View (ECM,1997)
 Prime Directive (ECM, 1998)
 Not for Nothin' (ECM, 2000)
 What Goes Around (ECM, 2002)
 Extended Play: Live at Birdland (ECM, 2003)
 Overtime (Dare2, 2005)
 Critical Mass (Dare2, 2006)
 Pathways (Dare2, 2010)

With David "Fathead" Newman
 Still Hard Times (Muse, 1982)
 Heads Up (Atlantic, 1987)
 Fire! Live at the Village Vanguard (Atlantic, 1989)
 I Remember Brother Ray (HighNote, 2005)
 Life (HighNote, 2007)
 The Blessing (HighNote, 2009)

With others
 Kenny Barron, Golden Lotus (Muse, 1982)
 Donald Brown, People Music (Muse, 1990)
 Cyrus Chestnut, There's a Sweet, Sweet Spirit (HighNote, 2017)
 Billy Drummond, Native Colours (Criss Cross, 1992)
 Ray Drummond, Continuum (Arabesque, 1994)
 Geoff Keezer, Trio (Sackville, 1993)
 Jonny King, Notes from the Underground (Enja, 1996)
 Mulgrew Miller, Wingspan (Landmark, 1987)
 Mulgrew Miller, Hand in Hand (Novus, 1992)
 Houston Person, The Melody Lingers On (HighNote, 2014)
 Houston Person, Something Personal (HighNote, 2015)
 Chris Potter, Imaginary Cities (ECM, 2015)
 James Spaulding, James Spaulding Plays the Legacy of Duke Ellington (Storyville, 1977)
 Chip White, Harlem Sunset (Postcards)

References

External links
Steve Nelson: Vibing

American jazz vibraphonists
Living people
1954 births
Criss Cross Jazz artists
Musicians from Pittsburgh
Rutgers University alumni
Jazz musicians from Pennsylvania
Sunnyside Records artists
HighNote Records artists
Red Records artists